, is a Japanese kuge kin group. A cadet branch of the clan were daimyōs of Hida Province.

History
The clan claims descent from Sanjō Sanefusa (1146–1224) of the Fujiwara clan.

The head of the clan became a ''kazoku count in the Meiji period.

References

Japanese clans